Bjorn Olson (born January 13, 1991) is an American politician serving in the Minnesota House of Representatives since 2021. A member of the Republican Party of Minnesota, Olson represents District 22A in south-central Minnesota, including the city of Fairmont and parts of Blue Earth, Faribault, Martin, and Watonwan counties.

Early life, education and career 
Olson was born in Fairmont, Minnesota and attended Blue Earth High School. He earned a Bachelor of Arts degree in history and social studies education from Bethel University in 2013.

Olson serves as a Captain in the United States Army Reserve. He is a history teacher, farmer and served as the mayor of Elmore, Minnesota for two terms before his election to the legislature.

Minnesota House of Representatives 
Olson was elected to the Minnesota House of Representatives in 2020 and was reelected in 2022. He first ran after 13-term Republican incumbent Bob Gunther announced he would not seek reelection. Gunther endorsed Olson over his primary challenger. 

Olson has served as an assistant minority leader since his swearing-in, and also sits on the Taxes, Transportation Finance and Policy, and Veterans and Military Affairs Finance and Policy Committees.

Olson has opposed school bike safety programs due to the rural nature of his district, and opposed efforts to study commuter rail, saying it was like "throwing taxpayer dollars in a pit and lighting them on fire".

Electoral history

Personal life 
Olson lives in Fairmont, Minnesota with his wife, Hannah, and has 2 children. Olson previously resided in Elmore, Minnesota and lived in former Vice-President and U.S. Senator Walter Mondale's childhood home. He moved to Fairmont following 2022 legislative redistricting.

References

External links 

 Official House of Representatives website
 Official campaign website

Living people
People from Fairmont, Minnesota
Republican Party members of the Minnesota House of Representatives
Bethel University (Minnesota) alumni
People from Martin County, Minnesota
Educators from Minnesota
Year of birth missing (living people)